Gioele Bertolini (born ) is an Italian mountain bike and cyclo-cross cyclist. He competed in the men's under-23 event at the 2016 UCI Cyclo-cross World Championships  in Heusden-Zolder. He was on the start list for the 2018 European Cross-country Championship and finished 18th.

Major results

Cyclo-cross

2011–2012
 1st  National Junior Championships
2012–2013
 1st  National Junior Championships
 1st Junior Fae' di Oderzo
 1st Junior Milan
 UCI Under-23 World Cup
2nd Rome
3rd Hoogerheide
2013–2014
 1st  National Under-23 Championships
2014–2015
 Giro d'Italia Cross
1st Fiuggi
1st Portoferraio
 Shinshu Cyclocross
1st Round 1
1st Round 2
 1st Takashima City
 2nd Fae' di Oderzo
2015–2016
 1st  National Championships
 UCI Under-23 World Cup
1st Cauberg
2nd Namur
 3rd Overall Giro d'Italia Cross
1st Fiuggi
1st Asolo
1st Rome
 1st Schio
 EKZ CrossTour
2nd Eschenbach
 2nd Fae' di Oderzo
 3rd Beromünster
2016–2017
 1st  National Championships
 UCI Under-23 World Cup
1st Cauberg
2nd Fiuggi
 1st Brugherio
 2nd Fae' di Oderzo
 2nd Illnau
 3rd Overall EKZ CrossTour
3rd Eschenbach
2017–2018
 1st Brugherio
 1st Fae' di Oderzo
 1st Gorizia
 2nd Milan
 6th UCI World Championships
2018–2019
 1st  National Championships
 1st Gorizia
 1st Pfaffnau
 2nd Fae' di Oderzo
2019–2020
 2nd National Championships
 2nd Fae' di Oderzo
 2nd Brugherio
 3rd Vittorio Veneto
2020–2021
 1st  National Championships
2021–2022
 2nd Gran Premio Mamma e Papa Guerciotti
 2nd Hittnau
 3rd Illnau
 3rd Gran Premio Città di Jesolo
 3rd Increa Brugherio
2022–2023
 1st Ciclocross del Ponte
 2nd Hittnau
 2nd Trofeo Città di Firenze
 3rd Gran Premio Città di Jesolo

Mountain Bike

2012
 1st  Team relay, UEC European Championships
2013
 UCI World Championships
1st  Junior cross-country
1st  Team relay
 1st  Team relay, UEC European Championships
 1st  Cross-country, National Junior Championships
2015
 3rd  Team relay, UCI World Championships
2016
 1st  Cross-country, National Championships
2017
 1st  Cross-country, UEC European Under-23 Championships
 1st  Cross-country, National Championships

References

External links
 

1995 births
Living people
Cyclo-cross cyclists
Italian male cyclists
Italian mountain bikers
Cyclists from the Province of Sondrio